Arctowski Dome is an axial, main ice dome of King George Island, between 57°45'W and 58°50'W. Named by the Polish Antarctic Expedition, 1980, after Henryk Arctowski (1871–1958), a Polish meteorologist.

References
 

Ice caps of Antarctica
Poland and the Antarctic
Landforms of King George Island (South Shetland Islands)
Bodies of ice of the South Shetland Islands